The 1924 Vermont Green and Gold football team was an American football team that represented  the University of Vermont as an independent during the 1924 college football season. In their fourth year under head coach Tom Keady, the team compiled a 2–7 record.

Schedule

References

Vermont
Vermont Catamounts football seasons
Vermont Catamounts football